Virola surinamensis, known commonly as baboonwood, ucuuba, ucuhuba and chalviande, is a species of flowering plant in the family Myristicaceae. It is found in Brazil, Costa Rica, Ecuador, French Guiana, Guyana, Panama, Peru, Suriname, and Venezuela. It has also been naturalized in the Caribbean.  Its natural habitats are subtropical or tropical moist lowland forests, subtropical or tropical swamps, and heavily degraded former forest. Although the species is listed as threatened due to habitat loss by the IUCN, it is a common tree species found throughout Central and South America.

Uses
The tree is harvested for its wood. It is also a source of traditional medicinal remedies for intestinal worms. The Amazon Indians Waiãpi living in the West of Amapá State of Brazil, treat malaria with an inhalation of vapor obtained from leaves of Viola surinamensis.

Ucuhuba seed oil 
Ucuhuba seed oil is the oil extracted from the seed. It contains 13% lauric acid, 69% myristic acid, 7% palmitic acid, and traces of oleic acid and linoleic acid. Myristic and lauric acids comprised 91.3 mole % of the total fatty acids. Additional saturated fatty acids such as decanoic acid and stearic acid are minor components.

Ucuhuba butter

References

surinamensis
Endangered plants
Trees of Brazil
Trees of Costa Rica
Trees of Ecuador
Trees of northern South America
Trees of Panama
Trees of Peru
Taxonomy articles created by Polbot